Shisheh may refer to:

places

Shisheh, East Azerbaijan
Shisheh, Lorestan
Shisheh Garan

other uses

Shisha (embroidery)